Ivan Vasilev Stefanov (born 13 June 1967) is a Bulgarian retired football defender.

Club playing honours
Sliven
 Bulgarian Cup: 1990

Levski Sofia
 A PFG: 1994–95
 A PFG: runner-up 1995–96, 1997–98
 Bulgarian Cup: 1998

Valletta
 Maltese Premier League: 2000–01

References

 Profile at LevskiSofia.info

1967 births
Living people
Bulgarian footballers
People from Kazanlak
OFC Sliven 2000 players
FC Lokomotiv Gorna Oryahovitsa players
PFC Levski Sofia players
Valletta F.C. players
First Professional Football League (Bulgaria) players
Expatriate footballers in Malta
Bulgarian expatriates in Malta
Association football defenders
Bulgaria international footballers